Tom Bower (born January 3, 1938 in Denver, Colorado) is an American actor. He has appeared in a wide variety of television and film roles, including Die Hard 2 and The Bad Lieutenant: Port of Call New Orleans. He appeared in Chris Chan Lee's 2006 film Undoing.

Filmography

Film

 1975 A Woman for All Men as Construction Worker
 1976 The Commitment as Abe
 1976 Two-Minute Warning as Decker, S.W.A.T. Team Member
 1978 The Dain Curse as Sergeant O'Gar
 1978 The Winds of Kitty Hawk as William Tate
 1982 The Ballad of Gregorio Cortez as Boone Choate
 1984 Wildrose  as Rick Ogaard
 1984 Massive Retaliation as Kirk Fredericks
 1985 The Lightship as Coop
 1986 River's Edge as Detective Bennett
 1987 Beverly Hills Cop II as Russ Fielding
 1988 Lady in White as Sheriff Saunders
 1988 Split Decisions as Detective Walsh
 1988 Distant Thunder as Louis
 1989 True Believer as Cecil Skell
 1989 Wired as Detective
 1990 Die Hard 2 as Marvin
 1991 Talent for the Game as Reverend Bodeen
 1992 Aces: Iron Eagle III as DEA Agent Warren Crawford
 1992 American Me as Dornan (uncredited)
 1992 Raising Cain as Sergeant Cally
 1993 Relentless 3 as Captain Phelan
 1993 The Ballad of Little Jo as Lyle Hogg (uncredited)
 1993 Teenage Bonnie and Klepto Clyde as Peter Baker
 1993 Shimmer as Mr. Speck
 1994 Clear and Present Danger as Clark's Pilot (uncredited)
 1994 Against the Wall (TV Movie) as Ed
 1995 Far from Home: The Adventures of Yellow Dog as John Gale
 1995 Georgia as Erwin Flood
 1995 White Man's Burden as Stanley
 1995 Nixon as Frank Nixon
 1996 Follow Me Home as Larry
 1997 The Killing Jar as Detective Jake Pestone
 1997 The Last Time I Committed Suicide as Captain (uncredited)
 1997 Buffalo Soldiers (TV Movie) as General Pike
 1997 The Postman as Larry (uncredited)
 1998 Poodle Springs (TV Movie) as Arnie Burns
 1998 The Negotiator as Omar (uncredited)
 1998 Shadrach as Sheriff Tazewell
 1999 A Slipping-Down Life as Mr. Decker
 1999 Malevolence as Jim Bradley
 2000 The Million Dollar Hotel as Hector
 2000 Pollock as Dan Miller
 2001 Going Greek as Bill
 2001 Hearts in Atlantis as Len Files
 2001 Bill's Gun Shop as Tom
 2002 The Laramie Project (TV Movie) as Father Roger Schmit
 2002 High Crimes as FBI Agent Mullins
 2002 The Badge as 'Bull' Hardwick
 2003 The Tulse Luper Suitcases as Sheriff Fender
 2004 Below the Belt as Merkin
 2004 In the Land of Milk and Money as Lenny Cochran
 2005 The Amateurs as Floyd
 2005 Brothers of the Head as Eddie Pasqua
 2005 North Country as Gray Suchett
 2006 Flannel Pajamas as Bill
 2006 The Hills Have Eyes as Gas Station Attendant
 2006 Valley of the Heart's Delight as Sheriff Ackle
 2006 Undoing as Don
 2006 Three as Uncle Eugene Parson
 2006 Feel as Buck
 2007 Pain Within as Joseph
 2008 Familiar Strangers as Frank Worthington
 2008 Misconceptions as Judge Transome
 2008 Appaloosa as Abner Raines
 2008 Gospel Hill as Jack Herrod
 2009 Bad Lieutenant: Port of Call New Orleans as Pat McDonagh
 2009 For Sale by Owner as Sheriff O'Hare
 2009 Crazy Heart as Bill Wilson
 2010 The Killer Inside Me as Sheriff Bob Maples
 2010 Black Limousine as Mr. Esteridge
 2011 Session as Dr. Albert Solomon
 2011 I Melt with You as Captain Bob
 2011 Low Fidelity as Ralph
 2013 Dark Around the Stars as 'Silky'
 2013 Out of the Furnace as Dan Dugan
 2014 13 Sins as Father
 2014 The Ever After as Father O'Meara
 2014 Runoff as 'Scratch'
 2015 Digging for Fire as Tom, The Neighbor
 2015 Lamb as Foster
 2016 In Embryo as Ben (uncredited)
 2018 Light of My Life as Tom
 2019 As You Like It as Jaques
 2019 El Camino: A Breaking Bad Movie as Lou
 2019 Senior Love Triangle (2019 film) as William Selig
 2020 Fully Realized Humans as Richard

Television
The Rockford Files (1974-1976, 2 episodes) as Jeff Cooperman / Officer Hensley
The Bionic Woman (1976, 1 episode) as Ted Ryan
The Waltons (1975-1978, 26 episodes) as Dr. Curtis Willard / Rex Barker
Lou Grant (1979, 1 episode) as Lind
Barnaby Jones (1979, 1 episode) as Baxter
Hill Street Blues (1981-1986, 3 episodes) as De Petrus / Narcotics Cop
Murder, She Wrote (1984, 1 episode) as Jonathan Bailey
Misfits of Science (1985, 1 episode) as Jeffries
Miami Vice (1985, 1 episode) as detective Carter 
China Beach (1990, Season three episode 17 Thanks of a Grateful Nation) as Archie Winslow
Love, Lies and Murder (1991) as Leverette
The X-Files (1999, Season 7, episode 5) as Sheriff Harden
Roswell (1999-2000 Season 1, episode 13) as Hubble
The West Wing (2000, 1 episode) as General Ed Barrie
Cold Case (2005) as Curtis Collins 2005
Monk   (2008, 1 episode) as Bennie WentworthIt's Always Sunny in Philadelphia (2005-2012, 2 episodes) Criminal Minds'' (2013) as Damon Miller

References

External links

Tom Bower(Aveleyman)

1938 births
Living people
Male actors from Denver
American male film actors
American male television actors
The Waltons